Mammoth WVH is an American rock band founded and fronted by Wolfgang Van Halen, initially as a solo project while he was still a part of Van Halen prior to their disbandment.

History

Formation and development

Wolfgang Van Halen's musical talents started at a young age. In 2006, when Wolf was 15 years old, his father Eddie Van Halen stated on The Howard Stern Show that his son had unmatched musical talent, stating: "Wait 'til you hear this kid play bass, guitar and drums. He can do anything I do on guitar...the name 'Van Halen', the family legacy is gonna go on way after I'm gone 'cause this kid is just a natural."

Wolfgang Van Halen became an official member of Tremonti, guitarist  Mark Tremonti's own band (aside from lead guitar and writer for Alter Bridge and Creed) in 2013, replacing previous bassist Brian Marshall, who also plays for Alter Bridge. Wolfgang appears on Tremonti's 2015 studio album Cauterize and its 2016 follow-up Dust.

In a February 2015, Eddie announced that his son Wolfgang had started working on a solo project album. Recording took place at 5150 Studios, and lasted until 2017. Release of the debut album was delayed, as Wolfgang chose to spend time with his father, whose health was declining. In June 2019, Wolfgang appeared as a guest on his mother Valerie Bertinelli's Food Network television show, and announced that he had finished recording the album.

The first single "Distance" was released on November 16, 2020, as a tribute to his father, who died from a stroke on October 6, 2020, after years of battling lung cancer. Wolfgang later revealed that he began work on the song years prior as a coping strategy, while his father's health was declining, stating that he knew there would be an eventual death of his beloved parent, bandmate, and best friend.

In February 2021, Wolfgang announced that Mammoth WVH's self-titled debut album would be released on June 11 of the same year. Later that month, Wolfgang stated that Mammoth WVH will move forward as his primary project, confirming that while it started off as a solo project, he considers the lineup a band. The musician has additional plans with them including a tour. When asked why he recorded the entire album himself, he stated that he wanted to challenge himself and referred inspiration from Dave Grohl's work as the sole member of the early years of Foo Fighters.

In June 2021, Wolfgang described the debut album as "personal" and "therapeutic", while acknowledging influence taken from his father's career. In developing the overall sound and style for the project, Wolfgang stated that while "I'll always be there to champion my father and his legacy...I definitely made a choice to not sound directly like Van Halen...I think that would be boring if I was a carbon copy of my dad."

Band name 
Wolfgang Van Halen chose the band's name to be Mammoth WVH, as a derivative of his father's first band named Mammoth, which eventually evolved into the legendary Van Halen. The younger Van Halen stated that the concept for the name came from a combination of inspirations. As a child, Wolfgang grew up hearing the name of his father's former band believing, "That's the coolest name! When I grow up, I want to call my own band that." The younger Van Halen admired that Eddie had a multi-faceted role including serving as the original lead singer of Mammoth, and with his intentions to solely write, perform, and produce the album, he settled on the name. Upon settling on the title, he presented his idea to his father who responded to it with immense positivity and gave his blessing.

2021–2022: Mammoth WVH
The debut album Mammoth WVH, was released on June 11, 2021. It was met with reviews from music critics ranging from overall positive to acclamation. Music Talkers complimented that the album "has its own distinct sound...no two tracks feel the same." Sonic Perspectives declared that while the musician was initially met with doubt and criticism, the album "would make [his father] proud" and to "expect to hear his name in this business for many years to come." While Riff Magazine criticized the calculated technique and perceived lack of risk-taking, they praised his musical technicality and acknowledged that "he can go in just about any direction he wants, not only because of his last name, but because he really is that good." Consequence Heavy stated that while the diversity of songs creates a lack of cohesion, it is a "deeply personal and musically rewarding debut" while declaring the musicianship to be "virtuosic".

Ultimate Classic Rock similarly praised the musical technicality praising the "disciplined focus" and stating: "It's going to be fascinating to hear how Wolfgang's music evolves on future albums." Louder Sound gave the album 4/5 stars, calling it "high-tech, energetic, relentless and thrilling" with Metal Planet Music similarly praising the album by classifying it as a "tour de force." Wolfgang commented on the album and its success, saying: "I’m so thankful that my father was able to listen to, and enjoy the music I made. I’m really proud of the work I’ve done and nothing made me happier than seeing how proud he was that I was continuing the family legacy."

After the release of the debut album, Van Halen added Frank Sidoris, Jon Jourdan, Ronnie Ficarro, and Garrett Whitlock to the lineup in preparation for an upcoming tour and for future albums. In early 2022, the band embarked on a co-headlining tour with Dirty Honey called the Young Guns tour. The tour ended in April.

2022–present: Upcoming second studio album
During an interview with Eddie Trunk on February 26, 2022, Wolfgang stated that he hoped to begin recording a second album in 2022 following a tour in support of the debut album, citing that he has enough material to record, as well as leftover tracks from the debut album to look at. On October 4, 2022, Wolfgang confirmed that the recording for the second studio album had begun.

Band members 

Official band
 Wolfgang Van Halen – lead vocals, lead and rhythm guitar, bass, drums and piano (2015–present)

Additional touring lineup
 Frank Sidoris – rhythm and lead guitar, backing vocals (2021–present)
 Jon Jourdan – rhythm guitar, backing vocals (2021–present)
 Ronnie Ficarro – bass, backing vocals (2021–present)
 Garrett Whitlock – drums (2021–present)

Discography

Albums

Singles

As lead artist

Promotional singles

Music videos

References

External links
Mammoth WVH official website

Musical groups established in 2015
Rock music groups from California